Gordon Jacob is a 1959 British short film (17 minutes) about Gordon Jacob from Ken Russell for the Monitor television series. It was Russell's first biopic of a composer.

References

External links
Gordon Jacob at IMDb
Gordon Jacob at BFI

1959 films
British television films
Films directed by Ken Russell